Pellio Intelvi was a comune (municipality) in the Province of Como in the Italian region Lombardy, located about  north of Milan and about  north of Como, on the border with Switzerland.  It is divided in two distinct centers, Pellio Inferiore (or Pelsotto) and Pellio Superiore (Pelsopra). It has been a frazione of Alta Valle Intelvi since 2017.
 
It is the birthplace of the Baroque sculptor Ercole Ferrata and of the architects Domenico Corbellini (18th century) and Carlo Lurago.

Main sights
Baroque Oratory of the Madonna del Fiume
Church of St. George, with Baroque frescoes and stuccoes
Church of St Michael Archangel

References

Cities and towns in Lombardy